James Prather Jontz (December 18, 1951 – April 14, 2007) was an American politician who represented the Indiana's 5th congressional district, comprising rural north central Indiana, centering on Kokomo and Logansport. A Democrat, he served in the United States House of Representatives from 1987 to 1993. He was previously a member of the Indiana General Assembly. As of 2020, he was the last Democrat to represent his district in Congress.

Early life and education
He was born in Indianapolis, Indiana in 1951. He graduated at the age of 17 from North Central High School in Washington Township in Indianapolis.

Jontz began his collegiate studies at Williams College and transferred to Indiana University, where he graduated with honors (Phi Beta Kappa) in less than three years with a degree in geology. He was active in Crisis Biology and lobbied on behalf of a host of environmental causes while a student on the IU Bloomington campus.  Despite a heavy study load, and involvement in student government and extra curricular affairs, Jontz co-founded the Indiana Public Interest Research Group as a Senior working project. He obtained a Master's Degree in History from Butler University, and graduated from Valparaiso University School of Law during his third term as State Representative .

Early political career 
His political career began in 1974, sparked by his opposition to a dam-building project in Central Indiana. Running for a seat in the Indiana House of Representatives against the dam's sponsor, House Majority Leader John Guy, he  was elected at age 22 - the second youngest person to serve in the Indiana House at the time -  by a margin of only two votes. He was reelected five more times in a heavily Republican district, even after the Republican-controlled legislature made it even more Republican on paper after the 1980 census. He was elected to the Indiana Senate in 1984, where he served for only two years before being elected to the U.S. House.

U.S. House of Representatives
Jontz's campaigns for Congress drew national attention. Celebrity supporters included singers Carole King, Bob Weir, and Don Henley, designer Liz Claiborne, and actors Bonnie Franklin and Woody Harrelson. Most of this support stemmed from Jontz's work on environmental issues.

In 1990, he appeared in the press room at Farm Aid IV where he played an impromptu straight man while Arlo Guthrie made jokes.

Elections
Jontz was elected to Congress in 1986 after the retirement of 16-year incumbent Republican Bud Hillis.  However, the Republican nominee, State Senator James Butcher, was wounded from a fractious Republican primary, allowing Jontz to win narrowly. He was handily reelected in 1988, but faced much stiffer competition in 1990.

Jontz was a progressive Democrat, which seemingly made him an odd fit for his mostly rural north central Indiana district, centering on Kokomo and Logansport. He relied on two key strategies for his congressional elections. First, he embraced a very personal style of populist politics that included frequent appearances in every community in his district. Secondly, Jontz assembled a highly talented and dedicated staff of individuals to work with him, and later many of them-including Tom Sugar, Mike Busch, and Kathy Altman-held prominent government positions.

Jontz was narrowly defeated in 1992 by Steve Buyer, an Army officer, Persian Gulf War veteran, and lawyer making his first bid for office.

Committee assignments
During his six-year tenure, he held committee memberships on the House Agriculture, Education and Labor, Veterans Affairs, and Select Committee on Aging. He also championed the preservation of the ancient forests in the Pacific Northwest, and worked to foster collaborations between organized labor and environmentalists.

1994 U.S. Senate election

Jontz attempted to return to Washington in 1994 by challenging three-term Senator Dick Lugar. He lost to Lugar by more than 600,000 votes, and even lost his old congressional district.

Post-congressional career
Following his 1994 defeat, Jontz subsequently moved to Portland, Oregon in 1999, where he began working as Executive Director for the Western Ancient Forest Campaign.  In 1999, Jontz helped organize the Alliance for Sustainable Jobs and the Environment (ASJE). While with WAFC, Jontz built a grassroots organizing campaign which pushed aggressively to protect forests, remove federal subsidies that financed clearcutting, and preserve millions of acres of previously unprotected roadless areas in National Forests. During his tenure with WAFC, he travelled extensively around the country forming relationships with state and local forest protection groups. As a result, Jontz was revered by forest activists throughout North America. In the spirit of Martin Luther King, Jr., Jontz participated in acts of civil disobedience — including blocking a logging road in the Siskiyou National Forest in Oregon — to raise awareness about the plight of ancient forests. These acts were hailed by forest advocates as further proof that Jontz was one of the greatest leaders of the modern environmental movement. In 1998, Jontz was elected president of Americans for Democratic Action (ADA). He was most recently the ADA president emeritus and served as a project coordinator for ADA's Working Families Win project.

Death 
Jontz died on April 14, 2007 in Portland, following a lengthy battle with colon cancer.

References

Further reading
 Boomhower, Ray E. The People's Choice: Congressman Jim Jontz of Indiana (Indianapolis: Indiana Historical Society, 2012), 259 pp.

External links

Obituary from the Indianapolis Star
Profile from the Northwest Labor Press
 

1951 births
2007 deaths
Deaths from colorectal cancer
Politicians from Indianapolis
Lawyers from Portland, Oregon
Indiana University alumni
Democratic Party members of the United States House of Representatives from Indiana
20th-century American politicians
Valparaiso University School of Law alumni
20th-century American lawyers
American environmentalists
Deaths from cancer in Oregon
Activists from Indiana